Rhys ap Gruffydd (c.1132–1197) was a Prince of Dehubarth in South Wales.

Rhys ap Gruffydd or Rhys ap Gruffudd or anglicized as Rhys Griffith, a Welsh name born by several historical princes and noblemen may also refer to:

Sir Rhys ap Gruffydd (c.1283–1356), South Wales nobleman and soldier
Rhys ap Gruffydd (rebel) (1508–1531), nobleman and rebel executed by Henry VIII

See also
Rhys Gruffydd (c.1513–1580), Member of Parliament for Caernarfon